= Stansted News Limited =

British publishing company

Stansted News Limited is a publishing company established in Bishop's Stortford, Hertfordshire in 1984.

Publications include:

- Stansted Reporter: The company's first publication was a free-distribution magazine for employees at Stansted airport, called the Stansted Reporter. This was renamed as the Stansted Magazine in 1985, and continued to publish until 1988.
- Fleet Operator Launched in 1988 as the official journal of the Association of Car Fleet Operators, and published until 2007
- Business Air News Magazine launched in 1989 as European Business Air News, and currently produced twelve times each year in editions worldwide.
- Global Business Jet Launched in 1999 and currently produced in the form of an annual Yearbook.
- Business Air News Handbook Currently produced in the form of annual Handbooks for the EMEA region and for long-range business aviation.
- Airframer Launched in 2005 and now the leading cross-reference directory of the aerospace supply chain.
- Infant and Infant Grapevine journal and magazine for professionals in neonatal baby care.
