= Airframer =

Airframer is a trade magazine and directory relating to aerospace design and manufacturing. The first issue of the magazine was released in September 2005. It is published by Stansted News Limited with offices located at Bishop's Stortford, Hertfordshire, United Kingdom.

== See also ==
- Aircraft Manufacturer
- Air Frame
